Captain Frederick Wollaston Hutton  (16 November 1836 – 27 October 1905) was an English-New Zealand scientist who applied the theory of natural selection to explain the origins and nature of the natural history of New Zealand. An army officer in early life, he then had an academic career in geology and biology. He became one of the most able and prolific nineteenth century naturalists of New Zealand.

Biography 

Hutton was born in Gate Burton, Lincolnshire, England, the son of the Rev. Henry Frederick Hutton and his wife Louisa Wollaston, daughter of the Rev. Henry John Wollaston. He passed through Southwell grammar school and the Naval Academy at Gosport, Hampshire. He studied applied science at King's College London before being commissioned in the Royal Welch Fusiliers and fighting in the Crimean War and the Indian Mutiny.

Hutton returned to England in 1860, and continued to study geology at Sandhurst, being elected to the Geological Society of London in the same year. Hutton married in 1863, and resigned his commission in 1866 to travel with his wife and two children to New Zealand, where four more children would follow. They lived initially in Waikato, where Hutton tried his hand at flax milling, but he soon changed back to geology, joining the Geological Survey of New Zealand in 1866 and becoming Provincial Geologist of Otago in 1874. At the same time, he was made lecturer in geology at the University of Otago and curator of the museum there. Hutton became professor of biology at Canterbury College in 1880, and was elected a Fellow of the Royal Society in 1892. The following year, he also took on the curatorship of the Canterbury Museum. Towards the end of his life, Hutton was made president of the Royal Australasian Ornithologists Union. He was awarded the Clarke Medal by the Royal Society of New South Wales in 1891. He was the first President of the New Zealand Institute (which later became the Royal Society of New Zealand), from 1904 to his death in 1905; he was followed by Sir James Hector. He was one of the inaugural vice-chairmen of the New Zealand Alpine Club, which was founded in July 1891.

He worked successively at the Colonial Museum, Wellington (1871–1873) (now called Te Papa Tongarewa Museum of New Zealand); Otago Museum, Dunedin (1874–1879); and the Canterbury Museum, Christchurch (1887–1905).

Hutton died on the return voyage on the SS Rimutaka from England on 27 October 1905, and was buried at sea off Cape Town, South Africa. He is commemorated in the Hutton Memorial Medal and Research Fund, awarded for scientific works bearing on the zoology, botany or geology of New Zealand. Hutton's shearwater (Puffinus huttoni), a sea bird, was named after him and the cave wētā Neonetus huttoni.

Evolution

In 1860, he wrote a supportive review of Charles Darwin's On the Origin of Species for the journal, The Geologist. In 1861, he wrote an article defending Darwinism in the same journal. Hutton defended Darwin from the objections of creationist Adam Sedgwick, which he described as "gross ironical misrepresentations". He wrote that creationism was a "mere assertion, an evasion of the question, a cloak for ignorance."

Throughout his life, Hutton remained a staunch exponent of Darwin's theories of natural selection, and Darwin himself expressed his appreciation in a letter to Hutton.

Taxa 
Taxa described and named by Hutton include:

Cabalus modestus (Hutton, 1872) – the Chatham rail
Callochiton empleurus (Hutton, 1872) – a chiton
Ericentrus rubrus (Hutton, 1872) – the orange clinid
Phosichthys argenteus Hutton, 1872 – a lightfish
Stegnaster inflatus (Hutton, 1872) – a sea star
Bittium exile (Hutton, 1873) – a marine snail
Colistium guntheri (Hutton, 1873) – the New Zealand brill
Comitas trailli (Hutton, 1873) – a marine snail
Dentalium nanum Hutton, 1873
Herpetopoma bella (Hutton, 1873) – a marine snail

Leptonotus elevatus high-body pipefish Leptonotus elevatus  (F. W. Hutton, 1872)

Margarella antipoda rosea (Hutton, 1873) – a subspecies of marine snail
Margarella fulminata (Hutton, 1873) – a marine snail
Novastoa lamellosa (Hutton, 1873) – a marine snail
Pterotyphis eos (Hutton, 1873) – a marine snail
Pterotyphis zealandicus (Hutton, 1873) – a marine snail
Pupa kirki (Hutton, 1873) – a marine snail
Rhombosolea retiaria Hutton, 1873 – the black flounder
Scorpis violacea (Hutton, 1873) – the blue maomao
Thoristella chathamensis (Hutton, 1873) – a marine snail
Trichosirius inornatus (Hutton, 1873) – a marine snail
Uberella vitrea (Hutton, 1873) – a marine snail
Xymene plebeius (Hutton, 1873) – a marine snail
Xymene traversi (Hutton, 1873) – a marine snail
Zeacolpus symmetricus (Hutton, 1873) – a marine snail
Zeacolpus vittatus (Hutton, 1873) – a marine snail
Jasus edwardsii (Hutton, 1875) – a spiny lobster
Paratrachichthys trailli (Hutton, 1875) – the sandpaper fish or common roughy
Bidenichthys consobrinus (Hutton, 1876) – the grey brotula or orange cuskeel
Anomia trigonopsis Hutton, 1877 – a marine bivalve
Notolabrus cinctus (Hutton, 1877) – the girdled wrasse
Eudyptes filholi Hutton, 1879 – the eastern rockhopper penguin
Leuconopsis obsoleta (Hutton, 1878) – a land snail
Proxiuber australe (Hutton, 1878) – a marine snail
Proxiuber hulmei (Hutton, 1878) – a marine snail
Thoristella oppressa (Hutton, 1878) – a land snail
Gallirallus philippensis macquariensis (Hutton, 1879) – the Macquarie Island rail
Pseudaneitea papillata (Hutton, 1879) – a slug
Patelloida corticata (Hutton, 1880) – a limpet
Latiidae Hutton, 1882 – a family of freshwater molluscs
Cytora calva (Hutton, 1883) – a land snail
Cytora pallida (Hutton, 1883) – a land snail
Cytora pannosa (Hutton, 1883) – a land snail
Homalopoma fluctuata (Hutton, 1883) – a marine snail
Lamellaria cerebroides Hutton, 1883 – a marine snail
Rhytida australis Hutton, 1883 – a land snail
Rhytida citrina Hutton, 1883 – a land snail
Rhytida patula Hutton, 1883 – a land snail
Fossarina rimata (Hutton, 1884) – a marine snail
Micrelenchus caelatus (Hutton, 1884) – a marine snail
Otoconcha Hutton, 1884 – a land snail genus
Leuconopsis Hutton, 1884 – a land snail genus
Microvoluta marginata (Hutton, 1885) – a marine snail
Powelliphanta lignaria (Hutton, 1888) – a land snail
Argosarchus Hutton, 1898 – a stick insect genus
Hemideina ricta (Hutton, 1896) – a tree weta
Isoplectron armatus (Hutton, 1896) – a cave wētā
Paprides armillaus (Hutton, 1897) – an alpine grasshopper
Paprides australis (Hutton, 1897) – an alpine grasshopper
Paprides torquatus (Hutton, 1897) – an alpine grasshopper
Exsul singularis Hutton, 1901 – an alpine fly

Hutton's publications 
 1871: Catalogue of the Birds of New Zealand, with Diagnoses of the Species
1872: Fishes of New Zealand, Catalogue with Diagnoses of the Species (by Hutton) and also includes Notes on the Edible Fishes of New Zealand (by James Hector)
1873: Catalogue of the Marine Mollusca of New Zealand, with Diagnoses of the Species
1873: Catalogue of the Tertiary Mollusca and Echinodermata of New Zealand in the Collection of the Colonial Museum
1875: Report on the geology & gold fields of Otago by Hutton and George Henry Frederick Ulrich, with appendices by J.G. Black and James McKerrow
1880: Manual of the New Zealand Mollususca. A systematic and descriptive catalogue of the marine and land shells, and of the soft mollusks and Polyzoa of New Zealand and the adjacent islands.
 1881: Catalogues of the New Zealand Diptera, Orthoptera, Hymenoptera; with descriptions of the species
 1887: Darwinism
 1896: Theoretical Explanations of the Distribution of Southern Faunas
 1899: Darwinism and Lamarckism: Old and New
 1902: The Lesson of Evolution 1st Edition
 1902: Nature in New Zealand (a popular work co-written with James Drummond)
 1904: Index Faunae Nova-Zealandiae (a complete list of all animals recorded in New Zealand)
 1904: The Animals of New Zealand, 1st Edition (a popular work co-written with James Drummond) 
 1905: Revision of the Tertiary Brachiopoda of New Zealand. John Mackay, Government Printer.
 1905: The Animals of New Zealand: An Account of the Colony's Air-breathing Vertebrates. 2nd Edition. Hutton, Frederick Wollaston, and James Drummond, Whitcombe and Tombs.
 1905: The formation of the Canterbury Plains. John Mackay, Government Printer.
 1905: Ancient Antarctica. Nature 72 (1905): 244–245.
 1907: The Lesson of Evolution. 2nd Edition, Printed for private circulation.
1909: The Animals of New Zealand 3rd Edition (a popular work co-written with James Drummond)

Family
Hutton married in 1863 Annie Gouger Montgomerie, daughter of William Montgomerie and his wife Elizabeth Graham. Their children included Gilbert Montgomerie Hutton (1865–1911) of the Royal Engineers.

References

External links 

 Barry C. Russell, Type specimens of New Zealand fishes described by Captain F.W. Hutton, F.R.S. (1836–1905); Journal of the Royal Society of New Zealand, Volume 26, Issue 2, 1996
 Bruce A. Marshall, Molluscan and brachiopod taxa introduced by F. W. Hutton in The New Zealand journal of science; Journal of the Royal Society of New Zealand, Volume 25, Issue 4, 1995
 
 Various digitised writings of F. W. Hutton held by the Biodiversity Heritage Library
 Frederick Wollaston Hutton in the 1966 Encyclopedia of New Zealand
Frederick Wollaston Hutton in the Dictionary of New Zealand Biography

1836 births
1905 deaths
Alumni of King's College London
British Army personnel of the Crimean War
British military personnel of the Indian Rebellion of 1857
British carcinologists
Critics of creationism
English biologists
English geologists
New Zealand Fellows of the Royal Society
New Zealand biologists
New Zealand zoologists
New Zealand ornithologists
People educated at Southwell Minster Collegiate Grammar School
People from West Lindsey District
People who died at sea
Royal Welch Fusiliers officers
Graduates of the Royal Military College, Sandhurst
Academic staff of the University of Canterbury
Academic staff of the University of Otago
Burials at sea
Directors of Canterbury Museum, Christchurch
Presidents of the Royal Society of New Zealand
20th-century New Zealand scientists
19th-century New Zealand scientists
People associated with Otago Museum